A spinnaker is a type of sail.

Spinnaker can also refer to:
 Spinnaker (software), an open-source continuous delivery platform
 The Spinnaker (building), in Durban, South Africa
 The Spinnaker, the official student newspaper of the University of North Florida
 Spinnaker Tower, a building in Portsmouth, United Kingdom
 Spinnaker Software, a former software company
 SpiNNaker (Spiking Neural Network architecture), a computer designed to simulate the human brain
 Spinnaker, the callsign for Scandinavian Airlines Ireland

See also
Spinnaker Island (disambiguation)